The Vine Cricket Ground, also known as Sevenoaks Vine, is one of the oldest cricket venues in England. It was given to the town of Sevenoaks in Kent in 1773 by John Frederick Sackville, 3rd Duke of Dorset (1745–1799) and owner of nearby Knole House. The land is thought to have possibly been used as a vineyard for the Archbishops of Canterbury.

Seven oak trees were planted on the northern edge of the ground in 1902 to mark the coronation of King Edward VII. Six were blown down in the Great Storm of 1987. In December 1987, seven new oaks were planted to replace those lost in the storm.

The ground
Sevenoaks Vine Cricket Club and Sevenoaks Hockey Club, both sections of the Sevenoaks Vine Club, play on the ground which is owned by Sevenoaks Town Council. It is located to the north of Sevenoaks town centre alongside the A225 Dartford Road.

Sevenoaks Vine Cricket Club pay a rent of 1 peppercorn per year for the use of the ground, the archetypal peppercorn rent, but pay for the upkeep of The Vine even though it is common ground. The cricket pavilion, which is a Grade II listed building built in 1850, is rented separately by the Sevenoaks Vine Club. In keeping with tradition, the club pay Lord Sackville one cricket ball on 21 July each year. In practice this ceremony happens every year on the Wednesday of cricket week, which is the second week in July.

A bandstand was built next to the pavilion in 1894 and the ground is overlooked by a number of residential properties, one of which, Vine Cottage, is contemporary with the establishment of the ground. The pavilion was renovated in 1934.

Cricket history
The Vine is one of the oldest cricket venues in the world. Its earliest known use was for a match between a Kent team organised by Lord John Sackville against one from Sussex on Friday 6 September 1734, a game which Kent won. A fixture was played to mark the bicentenary of the occasion in 1934.

Sevenoaks Vine was a venue for top class cricket matches in the 18th century and is notable for being the first place in England where cricket was played with three stumps rather than two.  A total of 24 matches which were given retrospective first-class cricket status were played on the ground between 1773 and 1829. These include nine matches between Hampshire sides and England and 11 matches featuring Kent sides as the home team.

The first recorded century in any form of cricket was scored on the ground in 1769, John Minshull scoring 107 runs for a Duke of Dorset's XI against Wrotham. Minshull, a professional employed as a gardener by John Sackville, went on to be the first player known to be given out hit wicket, again at The Vine, in 1773.

The world record for the highest known individual score in a top-class match was twice established at the Vine. First Joseph Miller, playing for a Kent team against one from Hampshire in August 1774, made 95 runs out of 240 and enabled Kent to win by an innings and 35 runs. Then, in June 1777, came one of the most significant innings of cricket's early history when James Aylward scored a record 167 for a Hampshire side against an England XI. In a contemporary report, it is stated that: "Aylward went in at 5 o’clock on Wednesday afternoon, and was not out till after three on Friday". Hampshire won by an innings and 168 runs in one of the first matches to use three stumps rather than two. Aylward's score was not surpassed until 1820.

The last use of the Vine for a top-class match was in 1829. The Vine was used by Kent County Cricket Club's Second XI for three Minor Counties Championship matches between 1952 and 1958 and by Kent Women between 1949 and 1973. The ground was not used for county matches by Kent County Cricket Club as it could not be enclosed due to its status as common land.

The ground is the home venue of Sevenoaks Vine who play in the Kent Cricket League.

References

1734 establishments in England
Cricket grounds in Kent
English cricket venues in the 18th century
History of Kent
Sevenoaks
Sports venues completed in 1734